The Longman–History Today Awards is the name of an annual awards ceremony, run by Longman and History Today magazine, in which prizes are presented in various categories "to promote the study, publication and accessibility of history to a wide audience." The awards, given in memory of one of the founding editors of History Today, Sir Peter Quennell, are announced at a gala event in London each January.

The award categories are:

The Trustees Award: given to a person or organisation that has done most to promote history over the last year or years.
Book of the Year: given for an author’s first or second book.
Picture Researcher of the Year: given to a researcher who has done outstanding work to enhance a text with the creative, imaginative and wide-ranging selection of appropriate images.
Undergraduate Dissertation of the Year: for the best dissertation presented by a final-year undergraduate at a British university.

Past winners

(note: in 2012 the decision was made to rename the awards for the year in which they are given. Hence, there is no award for 2011).

2019

2018

2017

2016

2015

2014

2013

2012

2010

2009

2008

2007

See also

 List of history awards

References

External links 
 Longman-History Today Awards website

History awards
Award ceremonies